Nias Utara (North Nias) Regency is a regency in North Sumatra province of Indonesia. It comprises the northern portion of Nias Island and has an area of 1,242.14 km2. It had a population of 127,244 at the 2010 Census and 147,274 at the 2020 Census. The official estimate as at mid 2021 was 148,790. The administrative capital is Lotu.

Administration
The regency is divided into eleven districts (kecamatan), tabulated below with their areas (in km2) and their 2010 Census and 2020 Census populations. The table also includes the locations of the district administrative centres, the number of administrative villages (rural desa and urban kelurahan) in each district, and its post code.

Notes: (a) except the village of Sisobahili, with a post code of 22817. (b) including offshore Pulau Sarangbaung. (c) including offshore Pulau Wunga. (d) including 17 offshore islands.

References

Regencies of North Sumatra